A burrito is a dish in Mexican and Tex-Mex cuisine that took form in Ciudad Juárez, consisting of a flour tortilla wrapped into a sealed cylindrical shape around various ingredients. The tortilla is sometimes lightly grilled or steamed to soften it, make it more pliable, and allow it to adhere to itself. Burritos are often eaten by hand, as their tight wrapping keeps the ingredients together. Burritos can also be served "wet", i.e., covered in a savory and spicy sauce, when they would be eaten with a fork and knife.

Burritos are filled with savory ingredients, most often a meat such as beef, chicken, or pork, and often include other ingredients, such as rice, cooked beans (either whole or refried), vegetables, such as lettuce and tomatoes, cheese, and condiments such as salsa, pico de gallo, guacamole, or crema.

Burritos are often contrasted with similar dishes, such as tacos, in which a small hand-sized tortilla is folded in half around the ingredients rather than wrapped and sealed, or with enchiladas, which use corn masa tortillas, and are covered in a savory sauce, to be eaten with a fork and knife.

Etymology
The word burrito means "little donkey" in Spanish, the diminutive form of burro, or "donkey". The name burrito, as applied to the dish, possibly derives from the tendency for burritos to contain a lot of different things similar to how a donkey would be able to carry a large burden.

History

Before the development of the modern burrito, the Maya civilization of Mexico used corn tortillas as early as 1500 B.C. to wrap foods, with fillings of chili peppers, tomatoes, mushrooms, squash, and avocados. Historically, the Pueblo peoples of the Southwestern US also made tortillas filled with beans and meat sauce and prepared much like the modern burrito. But these preparations could also be said to be the origin of the simpler taco, rather than the modern burrito.

The precise origin of the modern burrito is not known. In the 1895  by Feliz Ramos i Duarte, the burrito or taco was identified as a regional item from the Mexican state of Guanajuato and defined as "" (A rolled tortilla with meat or other ingredients inside, called '' in Yucatán and '' in the city of Cuernavaca and in Mexico City). Some have speculated that it may have originated with vaqueros, the cowboys of northern Mexico in the 19th century.

An often repeated piece of folk history is the story of a man named Juan Méndez who sold tacos at a street stand in the Bella Vista neighborhood of Ciudad Juárez during the Mexican Revolution period (1910–1921), while using a donkey as a transport for himself and his food. To keep the food warm, Méndez wrapped it in large homemade flour tortillas underneath a small tablecloth. As the "food of the burrito" (i.e., "food of the little donkey") grew in popularity, "burrito" was eventually adopted as the name for these large tacos.

Another origin story tells of Ciudad Juárez in the 1940s, where a street food vendor created the tortilla-wrapped food to sell to poor children at a state-run middle school. The vendor would call the children his "burritos", because burro is a colloquial term for a dunce or dullard. Eventually, the somewhat derogatory but endearing term for the children was transferred to the food that they ate.

In 1923, Alejandro Borquez opened the Sonora Cafe in Los Angeles that later changed its name to El Cholo Spanish Cafe. Burritos first appeared on American restaurant menus at the El Cholo Spanish Cafe in Los Angeles during the 1930s. Burritos were mentioned in the U.S. media for the first time in 1934, appearing in the Mexican Cookbook, a collection of regional recipes from New Mexico that was written by historian Erna Fergusson. In 1956, a frozen burrito was developed in Southern California.

Development of regional varieties

Mexico
Burritos are a traditional food of Ciudad Juárez, a city bordering El Paso, Texas, in the northern Mexican state of Chihuahua, where people buy them at restaurants and roadside stands. Northern Mexican border towns like Villa Ahumada have an established reputation for serving burritos. Authentic Mexican burritos are usually small and thin, with flour tortillas containing only one or two of several ingredients: either some form of meat or fish, potato, rice, beans, asadero cheese, or chile relleno. The  burrito has a variation with chile  (mild to moderately hot) and one with salsa verde (very hot). The Mexican burrito may be a northern variation of the traditional , which is eaten for breakfast, lunch, and dinner.

Although burritos are one of the most popular examples of Mexican cuisine outside of Mexico, they are only popular in the northern part of Mexico. However, they are beginning to appear in some nontraditional venues in other parts of Mexico. Wheat flour tortillas (used in burritos) are now often seen throughout much of Mexico (possibly due to these areas being less than optimal for growing maize or corn), despite at one time being particular to northwestern Mexico, the Southwestern US Mexican-American community, and Pueblo Indian tribes.

A variation of the burrito found in the Mexican state of Sonora is known as the burro percherón.

San Francisco Mission burrito 

The origins of the Mission burrito or Mission-style burrito can be traced back to San Francisco, in the Mission District taquerías of the 1960s and 1970s. This type of burrito is produced on a steam table assembly line, and is characterized by a large stuffed flour tortilla wrapped in aluminum foil, and may include fillings such as carne asada (beef), Mexican-style rice, whole beans (not ), sour cream and onion.

Ontiveros claims credit for inventing the "super burrito", a style which may have led to the early development of the "San Francisco style". This innovative style involves the addition of rice, sour cream and guacamole to the standard burrito of meat, beans, and cheese. The Mission burrito emerged as a regional culinary movement during the 1970s and 1980s. The popularity of San Francisco-style burritos has grown locally at Mission Street taquerias like , and nationally at chains like Chipotle Mexican Grill, Illegal Pete's, Chevy's Fresh Mex, Freebirds World Burrito, Qdoba, and Barberitos. Chili's had a brief stint with "Fresh Mex" foods and burritos between 2015 and 2017. In 1995, World Wrapps opened in San Francisco's Marina District and brought a burrito-inspired wrap style to the restaurant industry.

San Diego

San Diego-style burritos include "California burritos" and carne asada burritos. The style has been described by food writers as an "austere meal of meat, cheese and salsa", a contrast to the Mission-style burrito, which is typically larger and always contains more ingredients. A significant subgroup of Mexican restaurants in San Diego serves burritos described as "no-frills" and, in contrast to Mission-style burritos, the assembly line is not used.

In the early 1960s, Roberto Robledo opened a tortilleria in San Diego and learned the restaurant business. By 1999, Roberto's restaurants had expanded to a chain of 60 taco shops offering fresh burritos known for their distinctive quality. Hoping to draw on the prestige of Roberto's, new taco shops in San Diego began using the "-bertos" suffix, with names like Alberto's, Filiberto's, Hilberto's, and others.

The California burrito originated at an unknown -berto's named restaurant in San Diego in the 1980s. The Fresh MXN chain (formerly Santana's) also claimed to be the originator of the California burrito. The earliest-known published mention was in a 1995 article in the Albuquerque Tribune. The California burrito typically consists of chunks of carne asada meat, French fries, cheese, and either cilantro, pico de gallo, sour cream, onion, or guacamole (or some combination of these five). The ingredients are similar to those used in the "carne asada fries" dish, and it is considered a staple of the local cuisine of San Diego. With the merging of French fries and more traditional burrito fillings, the California burrito is an example of fusion border food. The California burrito has also been described as a "trans-class" food item, as it is regularly consumed by people across socioeconomic lines. Variants of this burrito may add shrimp (surf and turf), or substitute carnitas (pork) or chicken for carne asada.

The  is considered one of the regional foods of San Diego. Carolynn Carreno has said that to San Diegans, "carne asada burritos are as integral to the experience of the place as a slice of (pizza) pie is to a New Yorker." The San Diego-style carne asada burrito is served with chunks of carne asada, guacamole, and pico de gallo salsa. This "wall-to-wall" use of meat contrasts to burrito styles that use rice and beans as filler ingredients.

Los Angeles

Los Angeles also has several unique local burrito varieties. The first is the most traditional and is exemplified by the versions at Mexican-American restaurants such as Al & Bea's, Lupe's #2, and Burrito King. These restaurants have often been in existence for decades, and they offer a distinctly Americanized menu compared with the typical taqueria. The burrito of L.A. itself can take multiple forms, but is almost always dominated by some combination of: refried beans, meat (often stewed beef or chili), and cheese (usually cheddar), with rice and other ingredients typical of Mission burritos offered as add-ons, if at all.

The most basic version of this burrito consists of only beans and cheese; beyond this, there are the "green chile" and "red chile" burritos, which may simply mean the addition of chiles or a meatless chile sauce to the plain beans (as at Al & Bea's), meat or cheese as well. Rice, again, is rarely included, which, along with the choice of chiles, is one of the style's most defining traits. The menu will then usually go on to list multiple other combinations, such as beef and bean, all-beef, a "special" with further ingredients, etc. If the restaurant also offers hamburgers and sandwiches, it may sell a burrito version of these, such as a "hot dog burrito".

In addition to the version described, Los Angeles is also home to three burrito styles that can be said to fall under the category of Mexican fusion cuisine. The first is the famed "kosher burrito," served since 1946 at its eponymous restaurant at 1st Street and Main in Downtown Los Angeles. Another is the Korean kogi burrito, invented by American chef Roy Choi, the first to combine Mexican and Korean cuisines. The kogi burrito was named the seventh best burrito in Los Angeles in 2012 by the LA Weekly. The kogi burrito is accented with chile-soy vinaigrette, sesame oil, and fresh lime juice. Food writer Cathy Chaplin has said that "this is what Los Angeles tastes like." Finally, there is the sushi burrito, most notably the version sold at the Jogasaki food truck. Wrapped in flour tortillas, sushi burritos include such fillings as spicy tuna, tempura, and cucumber.

The existence of such a large truly Mexican community in Los Angeles also makes it possible to find a variety of authentic burrito dishes from different regions of Mexico: from Oaxaca to Hidalgo.

Variations and similar dishes

A wet burrito is covered with a red chili sauce similar to a red enchilada sauce, with melted shredded cheese on top. It is usually eaten from a plate using a knife and fork, rather than eaten with the hands. The Beltline Bar in Grand Rapids, Michigan, is said to have introduced the wet burrito in 1966.

A burrito bowl is not technically a burrito despite its name, as it consists of burrito fillings served without the tortilla. The fillings are placed in a bowl, and a layer of rice is put at the bottom. In 2017, a Meal, Ready-to-Eat version of a burrito bowl was introduced. It is not to be confused with a taco salad, which has a foundation of lettuce inside a fried tortilla (tostada).
A breakfast burrito, a take on the American breakfast, is composed of breakfast items, particularly scrambled eggs, wrapped in a flour tortilla. This style was invented and popularized in several regional American cuisines, most notably New Mexican cuisine, Southwestern cuisine, Californian cuisine, and Tex-Mex.
A chimichanga is a deep-fried burrito popular in Southwestern and Tex-Mex cuisines, and in the Mexican states of Sinaloa and Sonora.
A taco is similar to a burrito, but is served open rather than closed, is generally smaller, and is often made with corn flour rather than wheat. The taco editor of Texas Monthly argues that burritos are a type of taco.

Gallery

Research
Taco Bell research chef Anne Albertine experimented with grilling burritos to enhance portability. This grilling technique allowed large burritos to remain sealed without spilling their contents. This is a well-known cooking technique used by some San Francisco taquerias and Northern Mexican burrito stands. Traditionally, grilled burritos are cooked on a comal (griddle).

Bean burritos, which are high in protein and low in saturated fat, have been touted for their health benefits. Black bean burritos are also a good source of dietary fiber and phytochemicals.

See also

 Dürüm (a similar Turkish wrap)
 List of Mexican dishes
 List of tortilla-based dishes
 Sushi burrito or sushirrito

References

Further reading

External links
 FOUR BIG FACTS THE DAILY GOT WRONG IN ITS HISTORY OF THE BURRITO
 What is the history of the burrito? 

Cuisine of the Southwestern United States
Mexican cuisine
Belizean cuisine
Mexican Spanish
Street food
Tex-Mex cuisine
Tortilla-based dishes
Mexican beef dishes